Schmertz is a surname. Notable people with the surname include:

Herbert Schmertz (born 1930), political affairs consultant
Robert Schmertz (1926–1975), American real estate developer and sports franchise owner

See also
Robert Schmertz Memorial Trophy
Mittelschmerz
Seelenschmerz